Patrick Norman Yandall (born September 5, 1959 in Fort Bragg, North Carolina, United States) is an American smooth jazz guitarist.

Background
He was raised in Bay City, Michigan,  and is a 1977 graduate of T.L. Handy High School in Bay City. He attended Central Michigan University. His song "Mr. Fattburger" appeared in the film Fruitvale Station. His song "Who's the Bossa" from his album Samoa Soul appeared in the film War, Inc.. Yandall's music has appeared on television and news broadcasts. The single "Tower of Soul" from his album The Window  spent five weeks at No. 1 on the Smooth Jazz Now chart and reached No. 1 on the Live 365 smooth jazz radio chart monitored by Radio Wave.

His album From the Ashes (Apria, 2004) featured Randy Brecker, Will Lee, and Joel Rosenblatt. He has been featured in Jazziz, Smooth & Soul, and Smooth Jazz News. His album Eyes of Mars (2005) was No. 6 for the year on JazzLynx and was featured in Jazz Times magazine as one of the top albums of the season. Yandall is a session musician in San Diego, Los Angeles, New York, and New Jersey. His work has appeared on The Weather Channel's Local on the 8s segments.

Performing live, Yanadall has been able to achieve the status of being a festival favorite throughout the United States.

Career
Yandall's album Rouge River was one of the seven albums nominated in the "Best Jazz Album" cateory at the 2021 San Diego Music Awards.

Yandall was one the artists with multiple nominations at the 2022 San Diego Music Awards. His album Chasing the Lights was one of the seven listed in the "Album of the Year" category. It was also nominated in the Best Jazz or Blues Album category.

After the release of Yandall's album, Blues Alley, he was set to tour starting on December 18th to promote it.

Discography

Further reading
 All About Jazz, Jazz Musicians » Patrick Yandall
 Reverb Nation Patrick Yandall

References

External links

American jazz guitarists
Smooth jazz guitarists
Living people
1959 births
20th-century American guitarists
People from Fort Bragg, North Carolina
People from Bay City, Michigan
Jazz musicians from Michigan
Jazz musicians from North Carolina